Campostichomma is a genus of spiders in the family Udubidae native to Sri Lanka. Many of its species were moved to either Griswoldia or Devendra. This genus was originally placed in the family Agelenidae. It was moved to Miturgidae in 1967, to Zoropsidae in 1999, then to Udubidae in 2015.

Species
The World Spider Catalog accepts four species, :
Campostichomma alawala Polotow & Griswold, 2017 – Sri Lanka
Campostichomma harasbedda Polotow & Griswold, 2017 – Sri Lanka
Campostichomma manicatum Karsch, 1892 (type species) – Sri Lanka
Campostichomma mudduk Polotow & Griswold, 2017 – Sri Lanka

References

Spiders of Asia
Udubidae
Araneomorphae genera
Taxa named by Ferdinand Karsch